Aggregate base is a construction aggregate typically composed of crushed rock capable of passing through a  rock screen. The component particles will vary in size from 20 mm down to dust. The material can be made of virgin (newly mined) rock, or of recycled asphalt and concrete.

Base is used as a base course in roadways, as a base course for cement pads and foundations, and as backfill material for underground pipelines and other underground utilities.

"Base course" refers to the sub-base layer of an asphalt roadway. Generally consisting of larger grade aggregate, spread and compacted to provide a stable base for further layers of aggregates or asphalt pavement. Aggregate base course is often referred to as ABC.

Pavement engineering
Pavements